An automatic door, also known as an auto door, is a door that opens automatically, usually on sensing the approach of a person. A person can be detected by microwave pulses, infrared sensors or pressure-sensing pads.

History
In the 1st century AD, mathematician Heron of Alexandria in Roman Egypt invented the first known automatic door. He described two different automatic door applications. The first application used heat from a fire lit by the city's temple priest.  After a few hours atmospheric pressure built up in a brass vessel causing it to pump water into adjacent containers. These containers acted as weights that – through a series of ropes and pulleys – would open the temple's doors at about the time people were to arrive for prayer. Heron used a similar application to open the gates to the city.

In 1931, engineers Horace H. Raymond and Sheldon S. Roby of the tool and hardware manufacturer Stanley Works designed the first model of an optical device triggering the opening of an automatic door. The invention was patented and installed in Wilcox's Pier Restaurant in West Haven, Connecticut for the benefit of waiters carrying plates of food and drink. The entire system plus installation was sold for $100.

In 1954, Dee Horton and Lew Hewitt invented the first sliding automatic door. The automatic door used a mat actuator. In 1960, they co-founded Horton Automatics Inc and placed the first commercial automatic sliding door on the market.

With the invention of the Gunn diode, microwave motion detectors became common in automatic doors in the 1970s. And in 1980 the first automatic doors using an infrared sensor was introduced.

In popular culture
 In H. G. Wells’ 1899 serialised story When the Sleeper Wakes appears an automatic door that slides upwards into the ceiling.
 Automatic pocket doors are a common fixture of the fictional universe of Star Trek.

See also
 Electronic lock

References

 
Types of gates
Automatic Garage Door